Labeo batesii is a species of fish in the genus Labeo from the Lower Guinea region of west Africa.

References 

 

Labeo
Fish described in 1911